Everybody's Everything (stylized as EVERYBODY'S EVERYTHING) is the first compilation album by American rapper Lil Peep. It was released on November 15, 2019, by AUTNMY via Columbia Records, exactly two years after his death. The album was announced on November 1, 2019, which would have been the rapper's 23rd birthday. The album was released alongside a documentary of the same name. Several pop-up events to take place in November in New York City and Los Angeles were planned. The album was supported by four singles: "I've Been Waiting", "Moving On", "Belgium", and "When I Lie". The latter three songs are from his EP, Goth Angel Sinner, which was released on October 31, 2019.

Background
The album features a collection of new and previously unreleased tracks. New tracks featured are the collaborations with Gab3 as well as the solo song "Princess", while previously released tracks include "Cobain" and "Walk Away as the Door Slams" from the mixtape Hellboy, "witchblades" from the EP Castles II which was produced by Bighead, and all three tracks from the EP Goth Angel Sinner. Regular producer and collaborator Bighead has re-release features on the album which in addition to "Witchblades" includes "Liar" as well as the new track "Aquafina" featuring Rich the Kid. A press release described the album as "a lovingly-curated collection of songs from Lil Peep's career".

Track listing

Notes
"Live Forever" samples "Just a Boy" by Walleater.
"Ghost Boy" samples "The House" by The Softies.
"White Tee" samples "Such Great Heights" by The Postal Service.
"Cobain" samples "Bad News" by Owen.
"Witchblades" samples "The Real You" by Three Days Grace.
"Walk Away as the Door Slams" (acoustic) is an acoustic cover of the song from Hellboy, which samples the acoustic version of "155" by +44.

Charts

Certifications

References

2019 compilation albums
Compilation albums published posthumously
Columbia Records albums
Lil Peep albums
Albums produced by Diplo